Old Trecastle Farmhouse, Pen-y-clawdd, Monmouthshire is a farmhouse, originally, a gentry house, dating from the 16th and 17th centuries. It stands on the site of the outworks of a Norman motte-and-bailey castle. The house is Grade II* listed.

History
The farmhouse stands on the outworks of a Norman motte-and-bailey castle, suggesting a lengthy history of human habitation. The present building was constructed as a gentry house in the 16th and 17th centuries under the ownership of the Aylworths, Catholic recusants.  In the 19th century, the house, by then reduced to the status of a farmhouse, became part of the Duke of Beaufort's Monmouthshire Troy House estate. It was sold to Monmouthshire County Council in 1900, when the Beauforts divested themselves of their extensive Monmouthshire properties, and is now tenanted.

Architecture and description
Old Trecastle Farmhouse is constructed of whitewashed rubble with a slate roof and chimney stacks of brick. It is a Grade II* listed structure. A stone barn to the north of the farmhouse is recorded on the RCAHMW Coflein database. The house is described, and illustrated, in the second volume of Sir Cyril Fox and Lord Raglan’s study of vernacular architecture, Monmouthshire Houses.

Notes

References

Sources
 
 

Grade II* listed buildings in Monmouthshire
Grade II* listed houses